Parachutes is the second album by guitarist and singer-songwriter Frank Iero and the first one with his backup band the Patience. It was released on October 28, 2016 via Vagrant Records with exclusive license to Hassle Records for the UK release. In February 2017, the band supported Taking Back Sunday on their tour of the UK.

Track listing 
Track listing per booklet.

Personnel
Personnel per sleeve.

Frank Iero and the Patience
 Frank Iero – lead vocals, guitar
 Evan Nestor – guitar, backing vocals
 Steve Evetts – bass
 Matt Olsson – drums, backing vocals

Production and design
 Ross Robinson – producer
 Steve Evetts – engineer, mixing
 Alan Douches – mastering
 Angela Deanne – album art
 Randall Leddy – layout

Charts

References

2016 albums
Frank Iero albums
Albums produced by Ross Robinson
Vagrant Records albums